Elkwood in Georgetown, Kentucky, also known as the Sabret and Nancy Payne Offut House, is a stone house built in c.1810.  It was listed on the National Register of Historic Places in 1978.

Modifications in the 1860s or 1870s added two dormers and a central gable, and lengthened four windows.  A one-story Victorian porch was added but later was removed.

It is associated with John Payne (1764-1837), one of Scott County's earliest settlers and a brigadier general in the War of 1812.

It is not far from the John Payne House, also listed on the National Register.

References

Houses on the National Register of Historic Places in Kentucky
Houses completed in 1810
Houses in Georgetown, Kentucky
National Register of Historic Places in Scott County, Kentucky
Stone houses in Kentucky
1810 establishments in Kentucky